Barbara Marcia Ker-Seymer (20 January 190525 May 1993) was a British photographer and society figure, considered one of the group designated by the tabloid press as 'Bright Young People'.

Early life
Born in Kensington, the second daughter of Horace Vere Clay Ker-Seymer (or Clay-Ker-Seymer; his father was Harry Ernest Clay, son of politician James Clay and brother of the composer Frederic Clay; for inheritance purposes his mother's surname of Ker-Seymer was appended), of a landed gentry family of Hanford, Dorset which had somewhat descended in wealth by this time, a situation primarily attributable to Horace's gambling addiction, which led him to squander his fortune- including the family's house- and caused estrangement from his wife), and Diana, the third daughter of Walter Pennington Creyke (died 1892), of Seamore Place, Park Lane, and Caroline (1844-1946), a writer as "Diane Chasseresse" and daughter of the agricultural scientist and entrepreneur Sir John Bennet Lawes, 1st Baronet. A younger sister, Pauline, was born in 1906, but died the next year. By the time Barbara left school, she, her mother and her elder sister, Manon (born 1903) were living at West Kensington, which was perceived at the time to be a place 'where the fly-blown respectability of the lower middle class clings to its dreary outposts against the slums'. Diana Ker-Seymer, whose 'preferences were lesbian', 'periodically retreated abroad with a girlfriend,' which did nothing to stabilise family life. Despite her mother's view of the family as 'poor', at least relative to the manner in which she had been brought up, Barbara was nevertheless presented at court as a debutante, expensively attired (including with the customary ostrich feathers), alongside Meraud Guinness.

Career
After leaving the Chelsea School of Art, a meeting with society photographer Olivia Wyndham inspired Ker-Seymer to teach herself photography. Her work eschewed artifice, instead aiming at producing naturalistic images, with her sitters relaxed rather than posed, as though they were 'just sitting around'. These subjects included Nancy Cunard, Raymond Mortimer, Frederick Ashton, Edward Burra, Gertrude Stein and Julia Strachey.

She opened her London studio- above Asprey the jewellers- in 1931, and at around the same time produced for Harper's Bazaar the photographic series 'Footprints in the Sand' about up-and-coming writers; one of her sitters was Evelyn Waugh. She was a friend of the Surrealist artist John Banting, managing to keep his suicidal moods at bay with her upbeat personality.

With the onset of the Second World War and the dispersal of the avant-garde scene in which she had operated, along with changes in public attitudes and shortages of photographic supplies, Ker-Seymer abandoned her photography for work in a film studio, and spent the majority of the war living in the remote English countryside. She never returned to photography, instead opening one of London's first launderettes. She enjoyed the work, and the business became successful, which allowed her to bring up her son in security.

Personal life

Ker-Seymer was married twice: first, in June 1941, to Humphrey Joseph Robinson Pease, of Yewden Manor, Henley-on-Thames, a researcher for Mass-Observation; second, in March 1945, to John David Rhodes (d. 2007), with whom she had one son, Max Humphrey Lionel Ewart Rhodes (later Ker-Seymer), born 1947. They divorced in 1955. She died on 25 May 1993.

References

External links
Independent obituary, 29 May 1993
Follow-up obituary, 30 June 1993
Portrait by Humphrey Spender, National Portrait Gallery, London
Tate Archive 40, 1997 Barbara Ker-Seymer 'Fashion Sense' from www.tate.org.uk
Barbara Ker-Seymer in the British Film Institute

1905 births
1993 deaths
British debutantes
Photographers from London
Alumni of Chelsea College of Arts
People from Kensington
Place of death missing